The Research Ideas and Outcomes (RIO) is a journal claimed to be both peer-reviewed, and open-access, published by Pensoft Publishers, stating a goal to promote transparency, reliability, and effectiveness in scientific research.

Since its 2015 launch, the journal has been widely noticed on social media, with the proposal to publish practically any serious-looking submission being questioned.

History
The journal was established in 2015 with the idea of publishing research outputs of different kinds including computer programs, experimental data, and analysis workflows. One year after its foundation, it received a SPARC Innovator Award from the Scholarly Publishing and Academic Resources Coalition for its work in encouraging transparency in science.

Abstracting and indexing
The journal is abstracted and indexed in ProQuest databases.

See also
Open science
Open research

References

External links
 

Open access journals
Pensoft Publishers academic journals
Publications established in 2015
English-language journals
Continuous journals